Edia is a genus of moths of the family Crambidae.

Species
Edia minutissima Smith, 1906
Edia semiluna Smith, 1905

References

Odontiini
Crambidae genera
Taxa named by Harrison Gray Dyar Jr.